Cláudio Roberto Pires Duarte (born 15 March 1950) is a Brazilian former footballer and coach.

Cláudio Duarte is a sports commentator at RBS TV.

He was born in São Jerônimo, and has managed Juventude, Grêmio, Remo, Gama and Internacional among others.

Titles

Player

With: Internacional
Campeonato Gaúcho (1971, 1972, 1973, 1974, 1975 and 1976)
Campeonato Brasileiro (1975 and 1976)

Coach
Copa do Brasil Champion: 1989 (Grêmio)
Torneio Centro-Oeste Runner-up: 2001 (Gama)
Campeonato Brasiliense Champion 2001 (Gama)

References

1950 births
Sportspeople from Rio Grande do Sul
Living people
Place of birth missing (living people)
Brazilian footballers
Campeonato Brasileiro Série A players
Brazilian football managers
Campeonato Brasileiro Série A managers
Sport Club Internacional players
Sport Club Internacional managers
Santa Cruz Futebol Clube managers
Guarani FC managers
Avaí FC managers
Sport Club Corinthians Paulista managers
Grêmio Foot-Ball Porto Alegrense managers
Criciúma Esporte Clube managers
Fluminense FC managers
Paraná Clube managers
Esporte Clube Juventude managers
Sociedade Esportiva do Gama managers
Ceará Sporting Club managers
Grêmio Esportivo Brasil managers
Association football defenders